Keane is an Irish surname. It derives from the Gaelic Ó Catháin meaning ‘descendant of Cathán'. Variants include O'Cahan, O'Keane, Kean, and Kane.

Notable people 
Augustus Henry Keane (1833–1912), Irish journalist and linguist
Bil Keane (1922–2011), American cartoonist of The Family Circus
Bob Keane (1922–2009), American musician, manager of Ritchie Valens
Claire Keane (born 1979), illustrator
Colin Keane (born 1994), Irish jockey
Colm Keane (1951-2022), Irish broadcaster and author
Dillie Keane (born 1952), one third of the Fascinating Aida comedy cabaret trio
Dolores Keane (born 1953), Irish folk singer
Emma Keane, fictional character from Ackley Bridge
Fergal Keane (born 1961), BBC correspondent based in South Africa
Glen Keane (born 1954), American animator, son of Bil Keane
Jack Keane (born 1943), U.S. Army general
James Keane (disambiguation)
Jayne Fenton Keane, Australian poet
Jeff Keane, American comic strip artist, son of Bil Keane
John Keane (disambiguation)
Keith Keane (born 1986), Irish footballer
Margaret Keane (1927–2022), American painter of waif-like children with big eyes
Walter Keane (1915–2000), American plagiarist, sold her paintings as his own
Mark Keane (disambiguation)
Mervyn Keane, Australian rules footballer
Michael Keane (footballer, born 1982), a former Irish footballer
Michael Keane (footballer, born 1993), an English footballer who plays for Everton
Michael Keane (economist) (born 1961), Nuffield Professor of Economics at University of Oxford
Mike Keane (born 1967), Canadian ice hockey player
Molly Keane (1904–1996), Irish novelist
Patrick Keane (born 1952), Australian lawyer and judge
Paul Keane (born 1956), Australian actor
Peter Keane, American blues musician
Richard J. Keane (1933–2008), New York politician
Robbie Keane (born 1980), Irish footballer playing for Los Angeles Galaxy
Robert Emmett Keane (1883–1981), American actor
Rory Keane (1922–2004), Irish footballer
Roy Keane (born 1971), Irish former footballer; football manager
Sara Keane (born 1991), American footballer
Sarah Keane, President of the Olympic Federation of Ireland and CEO of Swim Ireland
Seán Keane (fiddler) (born 1946), Irish musician from the musical group The Chieftains
Seán Keane (Irish politician) (1899–1953), Irish Labour Party politician represented Cork East
Seán Keane (singer) (born 1961), Irish folk singer
Sheana Keane (born 1975), Irish broadcaster
Tom Keane, an American songwriter and musician who used to be a member of a pop musical group the Keane Brothers
Will Keane (born 1993), an Irish footballer